Taimoor Salahuddin better known by his online alias Mooroo, is a Pakistani YouTuber, Internet personality, Filmmaker , Actor and musician. Known primarily for his comedic YouTube sketches and vlogs, he is regarded as one of the pioneers of vlogging in Pakistan.

Personal life 

Mooroo was born in Lahore, Pakistan. Ethnically he is a Chinioti. He attended Aitchison College for his O-Levels, and then later, Allied school for A levels Beaconhouse National University. In an interview, he said that his sister could not pronounce his name "Taimoor" and used to call him "Moor" or "Mooroo" which he later adopted as his stage name.  

Mooroo married Eruj Hadi, who is an art director in January 2019. At the time of his marriage, there were some speculations on Pakistani social media circles regarding how he married someone of a darker complexion to break a 'stereotype', leading him to clarify that he married for love and not to make any social statements.

Discography

Album

Filmography 
In 2022, Mooroo appeared in Hum TV's Ramadan Special series Paristan as his debut, where he portrayed the self created character of Amanullah opposite Mira Sethi.

Awards and nominations

Other awards

References

Further reading
 The Express Tribune
 The Express Tribune
 The Express Tribune
 The News International
 The News International
 The News International

External links 
 Mooroo on YouTube
 Mooroo on Instagram

Living people
People from Lahore
Year of birth missing (living people)
Aitchison College alumni
Beaconhouse National University alumni
Pakistani YouTubers
Vlogs-related YouTube channels
Chinioti people